Canadian country music singer and songwriter Lindsay Ell has released five studio albums, one extended play, 11 singles, and 10 music videos. Ell released two independent albums in the 2000s before signing a recording contract with the Stoney Creek subsidiary of Broken Bow Records in 2013 and releasing her debut single, "Trippin' on Us". Four subsequent singles were promoted over the following three years with varying levels of success on the Canadian and American country airplay charts.

Ell's first label-supported album, The Project (2017), produced the two top-five singles "Waiting on You" and "Criminal" on the Canada Country chart, with the latter becoming her first number-one in her home country and first top-twenty single in the US. Since then, she has topped the American Country Airplay chart with her Brantley Gilbert duet, "What Happens in a Small Town", and topped the Canada country chart with "Want Me Back".

Studio albums

Extended plays

Singles

As a featured artist

Promotional singles

Music videos

Other appearances

Notes

References

External links
 Official website
 Lindsay Ell discography at Allmusic

Country music discographies
Discographies of Canadian artists